The 2013 season is Johor Darul Takzim F.C.'s 1st season in the Malaysia Super League after rebranding their name from Johor FC.

This is Fandi Ahmad's 1st season with The Southern Tigers. Tunku Ismail Idris has made many changes to the team's structure.

Squads

First team squad

Pre-season and friendlies

Malaysian Super League

Matches

Malaysia FA Cup

Malaysia Cup

Group stages

Knockout stage

Goalscorers
Includes all competitive matches. The list is sorted by shirt number when total goals are equal.

Transfer

In

Out

References

Johor Darul Takzim
Johor Darul Ta'zim F.C.